Olaf Nowak (born 24 February 1998) is a Polish professional footballer who plays as a forward for Podhale Nowy Targ.

Club career
On 30 July 2020, he returned to Zagłębie Sosnowiec on a permanent basis and signed a two-year contract. He left by mutual termination in January 2021.

References

External links
 

1998 births
Footballers from Kraków
Living people
Polish footballers
Association football forwards
Zagłębie Lubin players
Zagłębie Sosnowiec players
Wisła Płock players
Chojniczanka Chojnice players
Ekstraklasa players
I liga players
II liga players
III liga players